Megacopta cribraria, also called the bean plataspid, kudzu bug, globular stink bug and lablab bug, is a shield bug native to India and China, where it is an agricultural pest of lablab beans and other legumes. The bug, while harmless to houseplants and people, often enters houses. It is attracted to white surfaces such as the walls of houses or white vehicles, because of the high reflectance of the white surfaces as it relates to the bugs' simple eyes. As a defense mechanism, they emit a foul-smelling pheromone that also acts as a congregation pheromone. Aside from smelling foul, the liquid also creates a burning sensation and sometimes leaves a red welt on bare skin. It is similar to other Plataspidae in having a somewhat unusual symbiotic relationship with its gut bacteria. Before laying eggs, females deposit particles containing the symbiont, which are then eaten by newly hatched nymphs under natural conditions. Nymphs experimentally deprived of access to the symbiont exhibited slower growth, smaller body sizes and higher mortality.

The bean plataspid gives off an offensive odor when touched, squashed, or poked. Hosted by wisteria, green beans, and other legumes, the insect sucks juice from the stems of soybean plants and reduces crop yield. However, when the insect infests kudzu, another invasive species, it appreciably reduces the growth of that plant.

Ecology
In 2011 in its invasive range in Georgia, M. cribrarias aggregation score - Taylor's Power Law/Taylor's Law b - had an extremely high slope for adults. The b was 3.27 ± 0.115 and b > b > b. By the next year - and continuing at least into 2013 - the adult score was much lower and the order was reversed, with b > b > b.

Hosts
Cajanus cajan, Vigna unguiculata, Glycine max, Lablab purpureus, and Cyamopsis tetragonoloba.

Microbiome
Females are found by Hosokawa et al 2008 to produce pellets with their own microbiome species and deposit them near their eggs. Larvae then search for and consume these. If these pellets are absent they will search more than those successfully finding pellets, suggesting that microbiome provision is indeed the purpose of this entire process and this is not accidental.

Symbionts
M. cribraria lives in symbiosis with γ-proteobacteria, the bacterium Candidatus Ishikawaella/Candidatus Ishikawaella capsulata. Douglas 2015 interprets the results of Brown et al 2014 as finding this symbiont to be retained  identically  in the eastern North American invasive range, so its successful invasion and devastation of crops there is not due to symbiont switching. Douglas believes this is unsurprising given that M. cribraria has not switched host plants, and symbiont switching is a strategy which has been seen in invasive insects which need to digest an unfamiliar host native to their new range. Arora and Douglas 2017 interpret Brown to have not differentiated between various Ishikawaella and therefore the question of switching within the same genus remains open. Hosokawa et al 2007 similarly finds M. punctatissima and not M. cribraria to be naturally able to infest G. max, but that this is solely due to Ishikawaella and can be experimentally induced in M. cribraria by giving it M. punctatissimas symbiont. This sharp difference in function is produced by a very small genetic difference: Hosokawa et al 2007 finds their 16S ribosomal RNAs to be 99.9% identical.

Southeastern United States

In the Southeastern United States, M. cribraria is an invasive species, and was first noticed in northeastern Georgia in 2009. As of 2012, it was spreading rapidly into the surrounding states of Alabama, Florida, North Carolina, South Carolina, Tennessee, and Virginia. It has recently begun to invade Maryland and Mississippi, as well. In 2017, M. cribraria was observed in Texas.

Current research
Universities and corporations throughout the Southeastern United States have begun research into alternative means of dealing with the kudzu bug. Universities in Georgia, South Carolina, and North Carolina, such as North Carolina State University and Georgia State University, have produced publications since 2011 until 2014 regarding M. cribraria pest management. One recent work demonstrates that the kudzu bug's diet in Alabama is broader than originally believed.

In theory the complete dependence of the pest upon the symbiont for pest phenotype recommends an easy control method: Deliberately provide Ishikawaella which is defective on G. max. Even better this would then be transmitted vertically. However, because the effective symbiont is also already present in the target population, there is no reason to think that the defective symbiont would overwhelm or even persist alongside the pest enabling symbiont.

References

Further reading
  Supplemental.

External links
 Megacopta cribraria as a Nuisance Pest
 Species Megacopta cribraria - Bean Plataspid on Bugguide.Net
 "Globular Stink Bug Invasive"—Troy Bartlett's Photography Blog: Focusing on Nature's Little Wonders
 Megacopta cribraria on the UF/IFAS Featured Creatures Web site
 Kudzubug.org
 Kudzu Bug Distribution - Kudzu Bug 
 Species Profile - Kudzu Bug (Megacopta cribraria), National Invasive Species Information Center, United States National Agricultural Library.

Agricultural pest insects
Hemiptera of Asia
Insects described in 1798
Shield bugs
Invasive agricultural pests